The knock-out stage of the 2014 AFC Champions League was played from 6 May to 1 November 2014. A total of 16 teams competed in the knock-out stage.

Qualified teams
The winners and runners-up of each of the eight groups in the group stage qualified for the knock-out stage. Both West Zone and East Zone had eight teams qualified.

Format
In the knock-out stage, the 16 teams played a single-elimination tournament, with the teams split between the two zones until the final. Each tie was played on a home-and-away two-legged basis. The away goals rule, extra time (away goals do not apply in extra time) and penalty shoot-out were used to decide the winner if necessary.

Schedule
The schedule of each round was as follows.

Bracket
In the round of 16, the winners of one group played the runners-up of another group in the same zone, with the group winners hosting the second leg. The matchups were determined as follows:

West Zone
Winner Group A vs. Runner-up Group C
Winner Group C vs. Runner-up Group A
Winner Group B vs. Runner-up Group D
Winner Group D vs. Runner-up Group B

East Zone
Winner Group E vs. Runner-up Group G
Winner Group G vs. Runner-up Group E
Winner Group F vs. Runner-up Group H
Winner Group H vs. Runner-up Group F

The draw for the quarter-finals was held on 28 May 2014, 16:00 UTC+8, at the AFC House in Kuala Lumpur, Malaysia. The "country protection" rule was not applied, so teams from the same association could be drawn into the same tie.

There was no draw for the semi-finals, with the matchups determined by the quarter-final draw: Winner QF1 vs. Winner QF2 (West Zone) and Winner QF3 vs. Winner QF4 (East Zone), with winners QF2 and QF4 hosting the second leg.

The draw to decide the order of two legs of the final was held after the quarter-final draw.

Round of 16

|-
|+West Zone

|}

|+East Zone

|}

First leg

Second leg

Pohang Steelers won 3–1 on aggregate.

Guangzhou Evergrande won 5–2 on aggregate.

Al-Ain won 4–2 on aggregate.

Al-Ittihad won 4–1 on aggregate.

3–3 on aggregate. Western Sydney Wanderers won on away goals.

4–4 on aggregate. FC Seoul won on away goals.

2–2 on aggregate. Al-Sadd won on away goals.

Al-Hilal won 4–0 on aggregate.

Quarter-finals

|-
|+West Zone

|}

|+East Zone

|}

First leg

Second leg

Al-Hilal won 1–0 on aggregate.

Al-Ain won 5–1 on aggregate.

0–0 on aggregate. FC Seoul won 3–0 on penalties.

2–2 on aggregate. Western Sydney Wanderers won on away goals.

Notes

Semi-finals

|-
|+West Zone

|}

|+East Zone

|}

First leg

Second leg

Al-Hilal won 4–2 on aggregate.

Western Sydney Wanderers won 2–0 on aggregate.

Final

|}

Western Sydney Wanderers won 1–0 on aggregate.

References

External links
AFC Champions League, the-AFC.com

3